Glucose-1-phosphate phosphotransferase may refer to:
 Riboflavin phosphotransferase, an enzyme
 Phosphoglucokinase, an enzyme